Jessica Nicola Staddon is an American computer scientist with broad research interests that include cryptography, human–computer interaction, information visualization, coding theory, and information privacy. She is a research scientist at Google, and an adjunct professor of computer science at North Carolina State University.

Education and career
Staddon earned her Ph.D. in mathematics in 1997 at the University of California, Berkeley. Her dissertation, A Combinational Study of Communication, Storage and Traceability in Broadcast Encryption Systems, was supervised by Leo Harrington.

Her interests in computer science broadened through successive moves to RSA Security (1997–1999), Bell Labs (1999–2001), PARC (2001–2010), and Google, where she began working in 2010. She returned to academia as an associate professor at North Carolina State University in 2015, but later returned to Google.

References

External links
Home page

Year of birth missing (living people)
Living people
American computer scientists
American women computer scientists
University of California, Berkeley alumni
Scientists at Bell Labs
Scientists at PARC (company)
Google employees
North Carolina State University faculty
American women academics
21st-century American women